In geometry, the angle bisector theorem is concerned with the relative lengths of the two segments that a triangle's side is divided into by a line that bisects the opposite angle. It equates their relative lengths to the relative lengths of the other two sides of the triangle.

Theorem
Consider a triangle . The angle bisector theorem states that the ratio of the length of the line segment  to the length of segment  is equal to the ratio of the length of side  to the length of side :

The generalized angle bisector theorem states that if  lies on the line , then

When  is external to the segment , directed line segments and directed angles must be used in the calculation.

The angle bisector theorem is commonly used when the angle bisectors and side lengths are known. It can be used in a calculation or in a proof.

An immediate consequence of the theorem is that the angle bisector of the vertex angle of an isosceles triangle will also bisect the opposite side.

Proofs 

There exist many different ways of proving the angle bisector theorem. A few of them are shown below.

Proof using similar triangles

As shown in the accompanying animation, the theorem can be proved using similar triangles. In the version illustrated here, the triangle  gets reflected across a line that is perpendicular to the angle bisector , resulting in the triangle  with bisector . Because the ratios between corresponding sides of similar triangles are all equal, it follows that . However,  was constructed as a reflection of the line , and so those two lines are of equal length. Therefore, yielding the result stated by the theorem.

Proof using Law of Sines
In the above diagram, use the law of sines on triangles  and :

Angles  and  form a linear pair, that is, they are adjacent supplementary angles.  Since supplementary angles have equal sines,

which is the angle bisector theorem.

If angles  are unequal, equations and  can be re-written as:

Angles  are still supplementary, so the right hand sides of these equations are still equal, so we obtain:

which rearranges to the "generalized" version of the theorem.

Proof using triangle altitudes

 
Let  be the base (foot) of the altitude in the triangle  through  and let  be the base of the altitude in the triangle  through . This case is depicted in the adjacent diagram. If  lies outside of segment , then neither  nor  lies inside the triangle.

If  is the foot of an altitude, then,

and the generalized form follows.

Proof using triangle areas

Then

and

yields

Exterior angle bisectors 

For the exterior angle bisectors in a non-equilateral triangle there exist similar equations for the ratios of the lengths of triangle sides.

The three points of intersection between the exterior angle bisectors and the extended triangle sides  are collinear, that is they lie on a common line.

History
The angle bisector theorem appears as Proposition 3 of Book VI in Euclid's Elements. Heath goes on to say that Augustus De Morgan proposed that the two statements should be combined as follows:
 If an angle of a triangle is bisected internally or externally by a straight line which cuts the opposite side or the opposite side produced, the segments of that side will have the same ratio as the other sides of the triangle; and, if a side of a triangle be divided internally or externally so that its segments have the same ratio as the other sides of the triangle, the straight line drawn from the point of section to the angular point which is opposite to the first mentioned side will bisect the interior or exterior angle at that angular point.

Applications 

This theorem has been used to prove the following theorems/results:

 Coordinates of the incenter of a triangle
 Circles of Apollonius

References

Further reading
 G.W.I.S Amarasinghe: On the Standard Lengths of Angle Bisectors and the Angle Bisector Theorem, Global Journal of Advanced Research on Classical and Modern Geometries, Vol 01(01), pp. 15 – 27, 2012

External links 
 A Property of Angle Bisectors at cut-the-knot
 Intro to angle bisector theorem at Khan Academy

Articles containing proofs
Elementary geometry
Theorems about triangles